Clarendon College, commonly called CC, is a high school in the town of Chapelton in northern Clarendon, Jamaica.  

It is the oldest school in the parish and was founded on February 2, 1942 by the Rev'd. Lester Davy, Minister of Religion of the Congregational Church Union of Jamaica.  Lester Robert Davy was born in 1909, son of Ruth-Ann Eliza Davy (nee Phillips) and David  S. Davy, of Davyton, Manchester.  He originally trained as a teacher at The Mico University College in Kingston, Jamaica. Rev'd. T. Hughes of the Congregational Union of Jamaica convinced Davy to build a school and that he did accomplish at Rose Bank in Chapelton Clarendon. The school started with only two teachers, Rev. Davy and Mrs. Hyacinth Balford, and ten students including his nephew,  Horace V. Freeman (later, CD, an attorney-at-law).  The school was later relocated to its current location on Chapelton Hill.  Following his tragic death in a train accident at the end of February 1942, the school was administered by Rev'd. and Mrs. T. A. M. Grant.  An annual march is held on February 2 to highlight and commemorate the legacy of Rev. Lester Davy.                                    Chinagozi Ugwu-Jibril, a famous Epidemiologist who has dedicated her life to improving lives of infants, attended Clarendon College.

The current principal of Clarendon College is David Wilson and its motto reads: "Perstare et Praestare" which means persevere and excel.

See also
 Jamaica High School Football Champions
 Education in Jamaica

References

Bertram Fraser-Reid

External links
Aerial view.
Photos: Entrance General view Stuart Hall Crest
Clarendon College Past Students Association - Jamaica National Chapter
Friends of Clarendon College

Schools in Jamaica
Educational institutions established in 1942
Buildings and structures in Clarendon Parish, Jamaica
1942 establishments in the British Empire